Blaise Alexandre Desgoffe (January 17, 1830 – May 2, 1901) was a French painter who specialized in meticulously finished still-life paintings.  He was the nephew of the painter Alexandre Desgoffe and father of the painter Jules Desgoffe.

He was born in Paris and studied under Hippolyte Flandrin. He exhibited at the Paris Salon  from 1857 to 1882, where he was awarded a third-class medal in 1861 and a second-class medal in 1863. In 1878 he was made a Chevalier of the Légion d'honneur. He was awarded a silver medal at the Exposition Universelle of 1900.
He died in Paris in 1901.

Notes

References
Champlin, John Denison, and Charles C. Perkins. 1913. Cyclopedia of painters and paintings. New York: C. Scribner's Sons. 
Pennsylvania Academy of the Fine Arts. 1903. Descriptive catalogue of the permanent collections of works of art on exhibition in the galleries. Philadelphia: The Academy.

External links
 Blaise Desgoffe French blog with several pages about the artist, one in English

1830 births
1901 deaths
19th-century French painters
French male painters
French still life painters
Painters from Paris
19th-century French male artists